Carter Lindberg (born 1937) is an American historian. He is Professor Emeritus of Church History at Boston University School of Theology and is best known for his book The European Reformations.

Lindberg studied at Augustana College, the Lutheran School of Theology at Chicago, and the University of Iowa.

References

1937 births
Living people
Reformation historians
Augustana College (Illinois) alumni
Lutheran School of Theology at Chicago alumni
University of Iowa alumni
Boston University School of Theology faculty
Place of birth missing (living people)
Date of birth missing (living people)
21st-century American historians
21st-century American male writers
American male non-fiction writers